La Florida District is one of thirteen districts of the province San Miguel in Peru.

References

More information
http://www.atlascajamarca.info/index.php?option=com_content&task=section&id=29&Itemid=75